The 1913–14 FA Cup was the 43rd season of the world's oldest association football competition, the Football Association Challenge Cup (more usually known as the FA Cup). Burnley won the competition for the first and (as of ) only time, beating Liverpool 1–0 in the final at Crystal Palace, London.

Queens Park Rangers, then of the Southern League, reached the last eight.  They were the last non-league team to reach the quarter-finals until Lincoln City in 2017.

Matches were scheduled to be played at the stadium of the team named first on the date specified for each round, which was always a Saturday. If scores were level after 90 minutes had been played, a replay would take place at the stadium of the second-named team later the same week. If the replayed match was drawn further replays would be held at neutral venues until a winner was determined. If scores were level after 90 minutes had been played in a replay, a 30-minute period of extra time would be played.

Calendar
The format of the FA Cup for the season had two preliminary rounds, five qualifying rounds, four proper rounds, and the semi finals and final.

First round proper
38 of the 40 clubs from the First and Second divisions joined the 12 clubs who came through the qualifying rounds. Two sides, Stockport County and Glossop were entered instead at the Fourth Qualifying Round. Stockport went out at that stage, while Glossop and eleven non-league clubs won through to the First Round Proper.

Fourteen non-league sides were given byes to the First Round to bring the total number of teams up to 64. These were:

32 matches were scheduled to be played on Saturday, 10 January 1914. Seven matches were drawn and went to replays in the following midweek fixture.

Second Round Proper
The 16 Second Round matches were played on Saturday, 31 January 1914. One match was drawn, with the replay taking place in the following weekend fixture.

Third round proper
The eight Third Round matches were scheduled for Saturday, 21 February 1914. There was one replay, played in the following midweek fixture. Queens Park Rangers beat Birmingham City to qualify for the quarter finals: the last non-league team to achieve such a feat until Lincoln City in the 2016–17 FA Cup.

Fourth round proper
The four Fourth Round matches were scheduled for Saturday, 7 March 1914. There were two replays, played in the following midweek fixture. One of these, between Manchester City and Sheffield United, went to a second replay, which United won.

Semi finals

The semi-final matches were played on Saturday, 28 March 1914. The Burnley–Sheffield United match went to a replay, which Burnley won, going on to meet Liverpool in the final.

Replay

Final

The Final was contested by Burnley and Liverpool at Crystal Palace. Burnley won by a single goal, scored by ex-Evertonian Bert Freeman. The game was the last final at Crystal Palace and was played in front of a reigning monarch, George V, for the first time. Neither club had reached the FA Cup Final before.

Match details

See also
FA Cup Final Results 1872-

References
General
Official site; fixtures and results service at TheFA.com
1913–14 FA Cup at rsssf.com
1913–14 FA Cup at soccerbase.com

Specific

1913-14
FA
Cup